L'artisan (The Craftsman) is an opéra comique by Fromental Halévy, to a libretto by Jules-Henri Vernoy de Saint-Georges.

L'artisan was the first of Halévy's operas to be staged (Opéra-Comique, Paris, 30 January 1827). The trivial plot is set in a shipyard in Antibes. The opera was withdrawn after 14 performances and seems never to have been revived.

Operas by Fromental Halévy
1827 operas
Opéras comiques
Operas
Operas set in France
French-language operas